A Fool and His Money is an American silent comedy film from 1912. It is either the first film or one of the early films with an all-African American cast. It was directed by Alice Guy-Blaché, who is widely considered the first female film director. The plot involves people becoming wealthy and taking on an aristocratic lifestyle.

The film was rediscovered by California engineer David Navone, who found four reels of early 1910s films in a trunk he purchased at an estate sale. He gave them to the American Film Institute (AFI). It was preserved by the AFI's National Center for Film and Video Preservation at the Library of Congress Motion Picture Conservation Center. It was shown publicly on July 29, 2018 at Grauman's Egyptian Theatre in Los Angeles.

References

External links
 
 
 

1912 films
American silent short films
American black-and-white films
Silent American comedy films
1912 comedy films
1910s rediscovered films
Rediscovered American films
1910s American films